Ballinteer is a small southside suburb of Dublin, located in Dún Laoghaire–Rathdown, Ireland, extensively developed from the late 1960s onwards.

Geography 
To the west is Rathfarnham, to the east is Sandyford and Stepaside, to the south are the Dublin Mountains, and to the north is Dundrum. Ballinteer is also bordered by the  Marlay Park.

History 
Ballinteer originally consisted of some housing groups off Ballinteer Avenue (Mayfield Terrace, Ballinteer Gardens, and Ballinteer Park), built between the 1920s and 1950s, and locally referred to as 'Old Ballinteer'. Ludford Estate was built in the late 1960s, followed by Ballinteer Drive, Grove, Crescent, Close. The latter four roads were originally called Lissadel Estate when built in the late 1960s and early 1970s. The sprawling estate of Broadford was built between the mid-1970s and early 1980s along with the ex-council estate Hillview. The most recent estate, Ballintyre, began construction in 2005 and was finished in mid-2008.

Amenities 
Ballinteer has a range of shops and businesses including a mid-size supermarket located along Ballinteer Avenue. Also located here is a post office, two betting shops and two public houses. Every New Year's Day, the two public houses play a game of soccer in nearby Marley Park. Marlay Park is a large open parkland, with a craft centre near the old "big house"; the park hosts major concerts every year. Aside from St. Enda's, Dodder Park and Bushy Park (see above) and small green spaces, the area also hosts two golf clubs.

Transport 
Dublin Bus routes 14, 14c, 16, 16c,16d , and 116 and Go-Ahead Ireland routes 75, 75a and 175 all serve Ballinteer.

Education 
Primary schools in the area include Saint Attracta's, Our Lady's Boys' School, Our Lady's Girls' School, Scoil Naithí, and Ballinteer Educate Together National School.

Secondary schools serving Ballinteer include Ballinteer Community School and Wesley College.

Sports 
Ballinteer St. Johns is the local GAA club.

Broadford Rovers soccer club, established in 1978, is based at Stonemason's Way. Its facilities include two dressing rooms and two AstroTurf football pitches. The senior teams and seven-a-side teams play at Broadford Park on Saturdays and Sundays. The middle teams (under elevens to under eighteens) play at nearby Marlay Park. Broadford has produced players like Glen Fitzpatrick (Saint Patrick's Athletic), Richard Sadlier who played for Millwall, and Ian Daly who plays for Irish Premier Division Side St Patrick's Athletic F.C.

People 
 Jason Byrne, comedian
 Derek Daly, former racing driver
 David Gillick, 400m Irish record holder
 Coman Goggins, Dublin inter-county Gaelic footballer
 Jimmy Gopperth, rugby player
 Tom Kitt, Fianna Fáil TD and former Government Chief Whip
 David Kitt, an Irish musician
 David Malone, Paralympian, gold medal swimmer
 Danny O'Donoghue, lead singer of The Script
 Richard Sadlier, former Republic of Ireland soccer international 
 Carly Hennessy Smithson, singer, lived here until she moved to the United States

See also
 List of towns and villages in Ireland

References 

Places in Dún Laoghaire–Rathdown